HD 330075 b is an extrasolar planet approximately 164 light-years away in the constellation of Norma. This planet orbits the star HD 330075. It was discovered by the Geneva Extrasolar Planet Search team at ESO's La Silla Observatory using the HARPS spectrograph.

The planet has a mass about three quarters that of Jupiter. Its orbital distance from the star is less than 1/23rd Earth's distance from the Sun, which makes HD 330075 b an example of a hot Jupiter. One orbit around the star takes a little more than three Earth days to complete, as compared to one year for the Earth around the Sun.

References

External links
 

Norma (constellation)
Exoplanets discovered in 2004
Giant planets
Exoplanets detected by radial velocity
Hot Jupiters